Paňa is a village and municipality in the Nitra District in western central Slovakia, in the Nitra Region.

History
In historical records the village was first mentioned in 1239 (in form Poonh). After the Mongolian invasion of Hungarian Kingdom in 1241 the next preserved written mention is from year 1285. From preserved written sources it's clear that the village was property of the archdiocese of Esztergom. The village was one of the villages of Sedes de Verebel et Sancti Georgii, where lived church nobility serving the archbishop.

The noblemen from the village also fought in the Battle of Párkány as part of Hungarian forces (in banderium of archbishop) against the Turkish forces. The list of fallen heroes from Paňa is maybe the first detailed list of fallen men from one place in history of Central Europe.

The south part of village was known as Žigárd. The first preserved historical mention is older than of the village, it's from 1156 and 1232. In later period it was used as vineyard, but in 1970's it was destroyed. The Chapel of Saint Urban from 1862/1863 was also destroyed.

The Church of All Saints was built in 1722. The tower is from 1847. The church was damaged by earthquake at Kúty in 1906. The new inner painting of the building is from 1932. The frescoes are work of Hungarian painter Edmund (Ödön) Massányi. The Rieger organ is from 1933. The side altars are maybe older than the church itself.

Geography
It has a population of about 315 people.

Ethnicity
In 1919 Czechoslovak census from 730 people 486 Hungarian, 220 Slovak, 18 German lived in Paňa.

The Jewish community in the village was never bigger than 25 people in the village until their deportation to concentration camps in the second world war.

In the last census in 2011 there was from 347 people 315 Slovak, 15 Hungarian, 2 Czech, 2 Bulgarian, 1 Moravian and 12 with unknown ethnicity.

People
Károly Kossovich lawyer and member of MTA, Tivadar Szentkereszty teacher and ethnographer, László Czobor vicecomes and representative and others had family relationship with the village.
István Zsittnyan Hungarian teacher, cultural organizator taught her.
Alajos Bogyó actor, opera singer and director was born here in 1834.
Gyula Agárdy piarist teacher, caricaturist was born here in 1895.
Jenő Csiffáry teacher and lifesaver was born here in 1895.
Sándor Csuthy mayor and lifesaver was born here in 1900.
Ľudovít Vaškovič Czechoslovak deputy minister of finance was born here in 1919.
László Varsányi teacher was born here in 1921.

Nature

References

External links
https://web.archive.org/web/20080111223415/http://www.statistics.sk/mosmis/eng/run.html 

Villages and municipalities in Nitra District